WNYC Studios is a producer and distributor of podcasts and on-demand and broadcast audio.  WNYC Studios is a subsidiary of New York Public Radio and is headquartered in New York City.

History 
In May 2015, WNYC began distributing its shows Radiolab and On The Media. WNYC Studios was founded on 13 October 2015 with an inventory of 17 podcasts and national radio shows.

The venture is funded with a diversified model consisting of philanthropy, crowdfunding and sponsorship.

The first podcast launched by WNYC Studios was The New Yorker Radio Hour, a co-production with The New Yorker magazine. Hosted by The New Yorker editor David Remnick, the national radio show and podcast debuted on 24 October 2015.

On 29 March 2016, WNYC Studios announced the launch of the 2 Dope Queens podcast hosted by The Daily Shows Jessica Williams, and Broad City's Phoebe Robinson.  2 Dope Queens premiered on 5 April 2016.  On 6 April 2016, 2 Dope Queens reached #1 on the iTunes chart.

In late 2017, WNYC Studios launched two new podcasts for kids: This Podcast Has Fleas and Pickle (in production with ABC Australia).

Current shows

Consider This 

Launched in September 2020, Consider This is a shortform daily news podcast from WNYC and NPR. Hosted by Rebecca Ibarra, the show offers a mix of the day's top local stories from WNYC and national stories from NPR. It releases each weekday at 5pm ET. WNYC was part of the pilot group of twelve public radio stations across ten U.S. region that NPR tapped to bundle local news content with the national Consider This podcast that was launched in June 2020.

Death, Sex & Money 

Death, Sex + Money is an interview-style podcast hosted by Anna Sale that discusses the big questions "often left out of polite conversation." The podcast launched in May 2014 features celebrities, experts and listeners on topics of finance, grief, love and relationships. Stella Bugbee, editor in chief of The Cut hailed Sale as "a master of the craft."

The New Yorker Radio Hour

The New Yorker Radio Hour is a co-production of The New Yorker and WNYC Studios. It is hosted by David Remnick, who has been editor of The New Yorker since 1998. The hour-long national broadcast show and podcast is based on conversation, debate, humor, and regularly features writers, editors and cartoonists from The New Yorker.

On the Media 

On the Media is an hour-long weekly radio program and podcast, hosted by Bob Garfield and Brooke Gladstone, covering journalism, technology and First Amendment issues.

On the Media launched in 1995 and was reformatted and relaunched in 2001, and since then has been one of WNYC Studios' fastest growing programs, with more than 400 public radio stations broadcasting the show weekly. It won a Peabody Award in 2004 for providing listeners "an insightful journey into the inner workings and outer effects of the media". In 2013, co-host Brooke Gladstone won a Gracie Award for Outstanding Host. The episode "Bench Press," which looked at the Supreme Court and its relationship with the media, won both a New York Press Club Award and the American Bar Association's Silver Gavel Award in 2016.

Radiolab 

Radiolab was created in 2002 by Jad Abumrad. Robert Krulwich joined as co-host in 2005. The radio program and podcast explores broad, difficult topics such as "time" and "morality" in an accessible and light-hearted manner and with a distinctive audio production style.

Radiolab received a 2007 National Academies Communication Award "for their imaginative use of radio to make science accessible to broad audiences". The program has received two Peabody Awards; first in 2010 and again in 2014. In 2015 the episode "60 Words," which looked at the language used in the Authorization for Use of Military Force (AUMF), won a Headliner Award, a New York Press Club Award, and was the New York Festivals' Gold Radio Winner and Grand Award Winner. Also in 2015, the episode "Galapagos" won first place in the Society of Environmental Journalists Awards for Reporting on the Environment. The episode "Sight Unseen" won the Gold Award for Best Documentary from Third Coast Festival.

In 2011, Abumrad received the MacArthur grant.

The show has done several special multi-episode series exploring various areas. "Border Trilogy" was a three-part series that explored the United States Border Patrol's policy "Prevention Through Deterrence." The "Gonads" series, hosted by Molly Webster, looked at aspects of reproduction, fertility, and gender. "In the No" was a three-part series that looked at consent in the wake of #MeToo. "G" was a six-part series that explored the controversial science of human intelligence, from IQ testing and genetic intelligence predictors to the quest for genius.

On 5 December 2019, it was announced that Robert Krulwich would be retiring in January 2020, after fifteen years with the show.

On 25 September 2020 it was announced that Lulu Miller and Latif Nasser would be joining the show as co-hosts alongside Jad Abumrad.

Science Friday 

Science Friday (known as SciFri for short) is a weekly call-in talk show that broadcasts each Friday on over 400 public radio stations and is distributed by WNYC Studios.  SciFri is hosted by award-winning science journalist Ira Flatow and was created and is produced by the Science Friday Initiative. The program is divided into two one-hour programs, with each hour ending with a complete sign-off. The focus of each program is news and information on science, nature, medicine, and technology. SciFri is also available as a podcast and is one of the most popular iTunes downloads, frequently in the top 15 downloads each week.

The United States of Anxiety 

Hosted by Kai Wright, The United States of Anxiety, launched in mid-2016 and featured the voices of voters in Suffolk County, Long Island, NY, the deeply purple region of a blue state where Donald Trump won the GOP primary with 73% of the vote. Following seasons have explored "culture warriors", surge of female candidates in the 2018 mid-term elections, and a post-Reconstruction America. In 2017 Season One of the series was named Best Podcast by the New York Press Club in a special competition focused on coverage of the 2016 presidential campaign. The Atlantic included the series as one of the "Best Podcasts of 2018."

On 24 August 2020, it was announced that The United States of Anxiety would begin airing on WNYC-FM and AM on Sunday evenings.

Past shows

2 Dope Queens 

2 Dope Queens is a podcast hosted by The Daily Shows Jessica Williams and Broad City's Phoebe Robinson. The podcast features female comedians, comedians of color, and LGBT comedians, in an effort to represent people from different backgrounds. The podcast's guests include Naomi Ekperigin, Nore Davis, Aparna Nancherla, and Michelle Buteau.  On 6 April 2016 2 Dope Queens reached #1 on the iTunes chart. The last episode was released 14 November 2018 and featured an interview with former First Lady Michelle Obama.

Adulting 

Hosted by comedians Michelle Buteau and Jordan Carlos, Adulting was launched in May 2019. The podcast was taped in front of a live audience, and featured hosts Buteau and Carlos discussing topics surrounding adulthood with guests. Guests included Phoebe Robinson, Wyatt Cenac, Jim Gaffigan, Samantha Bee, and Vanessa Williams. The last episode was released 3 September 2019.

American Fiasco 

Hosted by Roger Bennett, co-host of the Men in Blazers television show and podcast, American Fiasco was a ten-episode podcast series that told the true story of the United States men's national soccer team's surprising failure in the 1998 World Cup. It included interviews with former players, coaches, executives, and TV personnel, as well as archival audio from key matches. Awful Announcing said the series "showcases great storytelling."

The Anthropocene Reviewed 

The Anthropocene Reviewed was a podcast hosted by author and YouTube personality John Green in which he reviewed different facets of the Anthropocene, the epoch that includes significant human impact on the environment, on a five-star scale. This can include completely artificial products like Diet Dr. Pepper, natural species that have had their fates altered by human influence like the Canada goose, or phenomena that only influence humanity such as Halley's Comet. Episodes were released monthly and typically contained Green reviewing two topics, accompanied by stories on how they impacted Green's own life. Green announced that the podcast is being adapted into a book that is set to be published by Dutton Penguin in May 2021, his first nonfiction book.

Blindspot: The Road to 9/11 
Launched September 2020, Blindspot: The Road to 9/11 was an eight-part narrative podcast series that explored the history of the lead-up to the September 11 attacks. The podcast was hosted by Jim O'Grady, a WNYC and former New York Times reporter. It was a co-production with HISTORY, and was based on the channel's television documentary Road to 9/11.

Caught: The Lives of Juvenile Justice 

Caught was a nine-episode podcast series that examined juvenile justice in America. Hosted by Kai Wright, it featured contributions from WNYC reporters, as well as poet and activist Reginald Dwayne Betts. In 2018 Caught won a duPont-Columbia Award.

Come Through with Rebecca Carroll 

Launched in April 2020, Come Through with Rebecca Carroll was a limited-run podcast series that featured a range of guests discussing issues of race amidst the backdrop of the pressing issues of the day, including the COVID-19 pandemic and the 2020 Presidential election.

Dear Hank & John 

Hosted by the Green brothers: authors and YouTube vloggers Hank Green and John Green. First released in 15 June, Hank and John Green answer questions e-mailed by listeners, give "dubious" advice and talk about the weekly news from the planet Mars and the 3rd tier English football club AFC Wimbledon. Episodes are typically around 45 minutes in length. Upon the podcast's debut, it reached the number 4 position on the US iTunes performance chart and hit a peak position of number 2 two days later. Dear Hank & John has also been charted on iTunes in the United Kingdom, Germany, France, Italy, Canada, Spain, Australia and Brazil. WNYC Studios was a co-producer of the show from November 2018 to November 2020.

Freakonomics Radio 

Created in September 2010, Freakonomics Radio is a weekly public radio show and podcast hosted by journalist Stephen Dubner, with economist Steven Levitt as a regular guest. The two had previously collaborated on the 2005 book Freakonomics. In July 2018 production moved from WNYC Studios to Stitcher Radio.

Free Shakespeare on the Radio 

Free Shakespeare on the Radio was a co-production with WNYC Studios and The Public Theater that reimagined the Theater's annual Free Shakespeare in the Park into a multi-episode radio play. The production was conceived after the COVID-19 pandemic prevented the annual outdoor play from taking place, the first time in nearly 60 years. The originally scheduled performance of Richard II was adapted for radio and directed by Shaeem Ali. The performance was dedicated to the Black Lives Matter movement and featured a cast composed predominantly of BIPOC actors, including André Holland, Phylicia Rashad, and Lupita Nyong'o. The New York Times said the cast "delivered electric performances, spotlighting the aural delights of Shakespeare's language."

Here's the Thing

Here's the Thing is a podcast interview series hosted by actor Alec Baldwin. On 24 October 2011, New York City's WNYC released the first episode of Baldwin's podcast, a series of interviews with public figures including artists, policy makers and performers. It was announced that WNYC Studios will no longer be producing the show after 10 November 2020.

More Perfect

Officially titled Radiolab Presents: More Perfect, the series was the first spinoff series from Radiolab. Hosted by Jad Abumrad, it explored how the Supreme Court's rulings shape the lives of Americans, as well as telling the stories behind some of the Court's most significant rulings. The three seasons aired from June 2016 to December 2018. The New Yorker hailed the series as being "subtly astonishing...both sobering in its thoughtful investigations of the United States government's unfairness to many of its own citizens and quietly optimistic in its desire to make us understand." The series won the American Bar Association's Silver Gavel Award in 2017.

Nancy

Hosted by Kathy Tu and Tobin Low, Nancy was a podcast that featured stories and conversations exploring the LGBTQ experience. The show ran from 2017 to 2020.

Note to Self 

Note to Self is a podcast hosted by Manoush Zomorodi featuring interviews about the impact of technology on everyday life.   Before she began hosting Note to Self, Zomorodi was a television reporter for the BBC.

Only Human

Only Human was a health-oriented podcast produced by WNYC Studios.  The podcast was hosted by Mary Harris, who previously covered health for ABC News.

Scattered 
Launched in October 2019, Scattered was a six-part podcast billed as an "audio memoir." The series traced comedian Chris Garcia's search to discover more about his father's life after his father died due to complications from Alzheimer's disease. Garcia first spoke publicly about his father's Alzheimer's on This American Life. He also appeared on 2 Dope Queens, recorded six days before his father died and what Garcia has called the "best set of my life." Robin Williams had called one of Garcia's many sets about his father, "beautiful, fearless, and straight from the heart."

References

External links 
  – WNYC Studios
  – WNYC Kids

Podcasting companies
Companies based in New York City
New York Public Radio